The following is a list of Radio Disney Music Award winners and nominees for Best Artist Turned Singer (also known as Best Actress Turned Singer).

Winners and nominees

2000s

References

Artist Turned Singer